Blacksad is a noir comic series created by Spanish authors Juan Díaz Canales (writer) and Juanjo Guarnido (artist), and published by French publisher Dargaud in album format. Though both authors are Spanish, their main target audience for Blacksad is the French market and thus they publish all Blacksad volumes in French first; the Spanish edition usually follows about one month later. The first volume, Quelque part entre les ombres (literally Somewhere between the Shadows, but simply called Blacksad in the US), was published in November 2000. The second volume, Arctic-Nation, was published in 2003 and the third, Âme Rouge (Red Soul), was published in 2005. An English translation of the third volume was delayed due to the bankruptcy of its North American publisher, iBooks. In 2010, Dark Horse Comics published all three translated volumes as one volume. The publication of this 184-page collection also coincided with the European release of the series' fourth installment, L'Enfer, le silence (literally The Hell, the silence), in September 2010. In 2014, a fifth installment of the series, Amarillo, was released in various translations.

The series has been translated from the original French and Spanish into Arabic, Bulgarian, Catalan, Chinese, Croatian, Czech, Danish, Dutch, English, Finnish, German, Greek, Hungarian, Icelandic, Italian, Japanese, Norwegian, Polish, Portuguese, Romanian, Russian, Serbian, Swedish, Turkish and Ukrainian.

Guarnido and Díaz Canales have received several prizes for the series, including three Eisner Award nominations in 2004, two Eisner Award wins in 2013, and an Angoulême Prize for Artwork. A video game adaptation of Blacksad, under the name Blacksad: Under the Skin, developed by the Spanish company Pendulo Studios, was released in 2019.

Synopsis
Rendered in a film noir style, the stories are set in late 1950s United States. All of the characters are anthropomorphic animals whose species reflects their personality, character type and role in the story. Animal stereotypes are often used: for example, nearly all of the policemen are canids, such as German Shepherds, Bloodhounds, and foxes, while underworld characters are often reptiles or amphibians. Female characters are often much more human-looking than their male counterparts.

The strip attempts to reflect a dirty, realist outlook and a dark cinematic style through fairly clean, realistic lines. Detailed watercolor drawings, including real-life places and cities, also contribute to the realistic feel of the series, despite the fact that characters are animals. The style of drawing has evolved throughout the series, with later issues displaying sharper, higher-quality colour and fewer grainy lines.

Cameos
The series occasionally features anthropomorphic versions of famous people, most notably in Red Soul. Adolf Hitler is portrayed as a cat (possibly in homage to Art Spiegelman's Maus), Senator Joseph McCarthy as Senator Gallo (a rooster), Mark Rothko as Sergei Litvak (a bear), the president as an eagle, and Allen Ginsberg as Greenberg (a bison), while Otto Liebber (an owl) bears a strong resemblance to many of the scientists involved in the Manhattan Project at Los Alamos.

Main characters
John Blacksad – hardboiled private investigator. Blacksad was raised in a poor neighborhood and spent much of his youth running from the police. This and his service in World War II likely account for his above-average marksmanship and fighting skills. He also spent a year in college as a history major before being expelled. Like other hardboiled detectives, Blacksad narrates his stories, adding cynical commentary on the evils of the world around him. Unlucky in love, he never seems to be able to form a lasting relationship, often due to circumstances beyond his control. He usually wears a dark suit and trench coat, and uses the alias John H. Blackmore on several fake IDs, including debt collector, FBI agent and customs officer.
Weekly – Blacksad's occasional sidekick. A red least weasel who does not like soap and water and has an odor problem, he has a near-constant optimistic attitude, working as a muckraker for a tabloid called the What's News.
Smirnov – Police commissioner and friend of Blacksad. A brown German Shepherd, Smirnov sometimes helps Blacksad to reach the rich and powerful which he himself cannot touch due to "pressure upstairs".

Volumes

The first three volumes listed here are released by Dark Horse Comics as a single publication titled simply Blacksad.

Somewhere Within the Shadows
Blacksad investigates the murder of the famous actress Natalia Willford, whom he used to be involved with – first as a bodyguard, then in a more intimate capacity.

Blacksad's first inquiries lead him to screenwriter Léon Kronski, Natalia's last known lover, who has disappeared. He finds Kronski already dead and buried under a pseudonym. After Blacksad is severely beaten by two hired thugs, the police arrest him. Smirnov, a police commissioner, explains to Blacksad that because of "pressure upstairs" he himself cannot investigate the matter any further. Smirnov offers him a deal, advantageous to both sides.

As Blacksad returns home, a goanna hitman and a rat goon attempt to kill him and each other. Blacksad shoots the rat, interrogates the dying goanna and finally uncovers the culprit of the whole affair: Ivo Statoc, a frog, the richest and most powerful businessman in the city, who considers himself above any law. Statoc himself shot the actress because of her infidelity. After brutally infiltrating the office suite at the top of his skyscraper, Blacksad confronts the completely calm and cold-blooded Statoc – who first offers him a job, and later a bribe. Blacksad rejects both offers as a matter of principle and shoots Statoc in the head. The police arrange it so it appears to be a suicide.

Arctic Nation
This volume deals with inter-racial violence and racial segregation of the 1950s in a pseudo-American suburb called The Line. The book also obliquely addresses issues of economic depression, sexual repression and perversion, all intended to expose the social malaise and prejudice that exist beneath the apparently harmonious surfaces of communities.

Observing the aftermath of a lynching on a city street, Blacksad meets his future sidekick, Weekly (a least weasel). Blacksad initially rejects him due to his unpleasant smell and obnoxious behavior. It is revealed that Blacksad is working for an old elementary school teacher, Miss Grey, who has asked him to search for a young girl named Kaylie. Miss Grey believes that Kaylie was kidnapped by Arctic Nation, a white supremacist organization. After befriending Weekly, Blacksad is harassed in a bar by three Arctic Nation members. Their leader, Huk (a white Arctic fox), turns out to be a close friend of the local police chief, Karup (a polar bear). Blacksad and Weekly are taken before Karup, who himself is revealed to be with Arctic Nation.

Blacksad confronts Kaylie's mother, Dinah, who has mysteriously failed to report her daughter's disappearance. He suggests an affair between herself and the son of Oldsmill (a white tiger), a rich white socialite, but doubts this lead when Dinah takes offense at the insinuation. Blacksad and Weekly cross paths with a violent black power organisation called the Black Claws, which were originally accused of Kaylie's abduction. They force Weekly to publish a statement denying their involvement in the kidnapping. Blacksad decides to meet Oldsmill, but discovers that Oldsmill's son is mentally disabled and thus unlikely to have had an affair with Dinah.

Meanwhile, Weekly investigates the activities of Karup's wife, Jezabel, and discovers that she is having an affair with Huk. She also has an emotional meeting with Dinah, who appears to blackmail Jezabel by threatening to reveal 'what she knows'. This compounds suspicion on Karup, who is already rumoured to be a paedophile. When Blacksad returns to Dinah's apartment, he finds out that she has been murdered. Suspecting Karup of the killing, Blacksad directly confronts him with his suspicions and reveals Jezabel's affair with Huk. In consequence, Karup attacks Huk and argues violently with Jezabel; during their tête-à-tête, it comes to light that they have never had sex.

At the violent climax, a black magpie called Cotten – who has been complicit in Kaylie's abduction against his will – leads Blacksad to an Arctic Nation meeting, located in a derelict war factory. There, Kaylie and Weekly – himself kidnapped by Arctic Nation – are hidden. Blacksad saves Weekly after Huk betrays and hangs Karup, supposedly for kidnapping and child abuse. As the factory burns and Cotten is killed by Huk, Blacksad rescues Kaylie and Weekly. Later, he finds Huk dead in his garage, stabbed in the eye with a screwdriver.

Blacksad corners Jezabel after Karup's funeral, proving, through a matching birthmark; that she is Dinah's twin sister. Jezabel reveals that Karup was actually their biological father, but had left their black pregnant mother to die after being turned by Oldsmill's racist doctrines. Both fueled by revenge, Jezabel ascended white society under a false identity, eventually marrying Karup. With Dinah hired as their maid, Jezabel seduced and manipulated Huk, using him to carry out the fake kidnapping and implicate Karup. However, Huk killed Dinah to ensure her silence, leading Jezabel to kill him in kind.

Blacksad meets with Miss Grey and compliments her on her dedication towards the neighborhood's children. After the two say goodbye, Blacksad finds Kaylie sadly staring at him, and he stares back sadly as well. The book concludes by highlighting Kaylie's innocence and her ultimate abandonment, but her fate is not made clear.

There are probably some discrepancies between publications. Cotten is also seen as Hewitt, Kayleigh as Kaylie, and some versions of the book end with Blacksad scattering Cotten's (Hewitt's) ashes to the wind over Las Vegas, fulfilling his last wish.

Red Soul
During the Red Scare, Blacksad is employed as a bodyguard for a rich old tortoise called Hewitt Mandeline, who goes on a gambling trip to Las Vegas. After returning home, Blacksad's last assignment is to accompany him to an art gallery, where he runs into Smirnov and his family. He finds a leaflet for a lecture given by his old school teacher, Otto Liebber, a nuclear physicist and Nobel Prize candidate. Also appearing is the wealthy philanthropist Samuel Gotfield, who heads a scientific research foundation; Blacksad takes an instant dislike for Gotfield, who makes a mockery of Otto's lecture. He also meets Gotfield's fiancée, the writer Alma Mayer.

Gotfield invites Blacksad to a party at his luxurious coastal mansion along with twelve leftist intellectuals: Greenberg, a beat poet; the photographer Dora; the sculptor Klein; the actor Bill Ratcliff; the scriptwriter Jess Logan; the Russian painter Sergei Litvak; the accomplished chemist Laszlo Herzl; and Alma Mayer. After Blacksad grudgingly saves a drunken Gotfield from drowning, with the help of Otto's close friend Otero, Herzl angrily accuses Otto of promoting nuclear weapons. When Otero gets back home, he is killed by a mysterious assassin (a gavial). It seems he actually meant to kill Otto.

Blacksad and Alma – who plans to spend her honeymoon with Gotfield at Niagara Falls – begin to have feelings for each other. Blacksad decides to follow Otto, saving him from a car bomb planted by the assassin. However, he fails to stop the goon from escaping or a traumatised Otto from leaving the scene. Smirnov informs Blacksad that the assassin is a highly regarded hit man known as Ribs, and that his bomb was chemically complex. Suspecting that Herzl might have hired Ribs, Blacksad confronts him. To his surprise, Herzl is a Holocaust survivor and Nazi hunter who shows him photographic proof that Otto used to work for the Third Reich.

Stricken with this new information, Blacksad seeks solace from Alma, only to learn that she has been arrested by the FBI after being inexplicably betrayed by Gotfield. When FBI agents visit Litvak in his studio, they accidentally kill him while using truth serum to ask about Otto's whereabouts. Otto, meanwhile, has returned to his old neighborhood – the same neighborhood where Blacksad grew up – only to find it overcome by poverty and his father's church a ruin. Suffering a personal crisis, Otto hides at the city aquarium, where Blacksad himself once hid as a child.

Blacksad rescues Alma from the FBI, taking shelter in Weekly's apartment. Falling in love with Alma, Blacksad promises to take her to Niagara Falls, which to her is an important act of commitment. Blacksad then finds a fatalistic Otto, who admits that his efforts to reduce the world's suffering have only left it worse than before. He also admits to conspiring with Litvak to hand over American nuclear secrets to the Soviets. Blacksad soon realizes that Litvak had copied Otto's information onto a canvas and then painted over it as a disguise. When Blacksad goes to the shipyards, he finds out that the painting is bound for an art exhibition in East Berlin. Blacksad manages to re-route the painting to Australia.

As Blacksad prepares to travel to Niagara Falls, the FBI arrests him and plant fake evidence in Litvak's death. He is interrogated by the demagogue Senator Gallo about Otto's current location. After he is released, Blacksad confronts Gotfield and learns that he betrayed Alma in order to win Senator Gallo's patronage and become part of a selected group of people who will be evacuated to a special government shelter in the event of a nuclear war. Finding proof in Gotfield's safe, Blacksad uses it to blackmail Senator Gallo into dropping his frame-up. The government fakes Otto's death and allows him to leave the country. Blacksad gives the proof to Weekly in a sealed envelope, with instructions to publish the contents if anything happens to him.

Otto writes Blacksad a letter, explaining that he has returned to Germany and is helping rebuild a post-war community. Alma, however, abandons Blacksad after she reads the (fake) story in the newspaper that Liebber committed suicide after Blacksad turned him in. In her mind, Blacksad is now as much a traitor as Gotfield. Blacksad tries to find her again, but she has vanished.

A Silent Hell
The fourth Blacksad album is a murder mystery set in the jazz scene of New Orleans. It has been translated into several European languages and released in the United States by Dark Horse Comics as Blacksad: A Silent Hell.

Notably, the story of the album unfolds in non-chronological order. The story alternates between day scenes and night scenes: the night scenes take place during a single night and are the culmination of the story, and the day scenes depict events that took place over several weeks before that night.

Blacksad and Weekly travel to New Orleans to meet Faust LaChapelle (a goat), a failed musician who found success signing more talented yet less fortunate musicians to record labels. They learn that LaChapelle has terminal cancer, and is being treated by Ms. Gibraltar, a vodou priestess. LaChapelle begs Blacksad to find Sebastian "Little Hand" Fletcher (a Boxer), who – despite having one arm smaller than the other – was the most successful musician he ever signed. Fletcher has gone missing, and LaChapelle is concerned that his addiction to heroin has something to do with it. Blacksad and Weekly accept the case.

The pair soon meet Leeman (a hippopotamus), the last detective who was hired to find Fletcher. He proposes they all work together, but Blacksad is put off by his reckless driving and alcoholism. Blacksad tracks down and roughs up Fletcher's drug dealer, who admits that a masked individual paid him to sell poisoned heroin to Fletcher. Later, Blacksad meets LaChapelle's son, Thomas, who has formed a friendship with Fletcher's pregnant wife, Hannah. The two get on well until Thomas asks Blacksad to give up the case for his father's sake; he believes Fletcher is a bad influence, and his father is wasting his money trying to find him when he could be saving it for his cancer treatment. Disappointed, Blacksad walks out. The conversation does lead him to ponder if Thomas cares for Hannah more than a friend and may be jealous of Fletcher's attentions.

Later, Blacksad finds Thomas and Hannah as she gives birth to Fletcher's son. Despite Thomas' insistence that he leave her alone, he questions her as to her husband's whereabouts. Hannah states that Fletcher was supposed to perform his newest song that night, but that LaChapelle had been enraged when he found out. Meanwhile, Weekly discovers that some of Fletcher's friends seem to have been mysteriously murdered in staged suicides, causing Blacksad to fear that someone might be after Sebastian's life as well.

At a nightclub, Fletcher performs his new song, detailing how he had become congenitally deformed and many others had died due to a carcinogenic flu balm that was being sold in his hometown by the mysterious "Dr. Dupre", and how bureaucratic payoffs kept Dupre from prison once he was found out. LaChapelle saved them from poverty by signing them all to a successful band. However, the conditions eventually caught up with them, leading them to lives full of addiction and death; now, only Fletcher is left to tell the tale.

Blacksad discovers that Leeman is responsible for killing Fletcher's friends, planning to blackmail LaChapelle with the truth of what happened in Fletcher's hometown. When Blacksad confronts LaChapelle in his house, he confesses to being Dupre and admits that he has a rare genetic disorder rather than cancer. He has been investing money in medical research to find a cure, so that his son might one day have healthy children to carry on his legacy. It is also implied that he had the drug dealer poison Fletcher to prevent him from performing the new song that would ruin LaChapelle. Weekly appears and urgently informs Blacksad of Fletcher's whereabouts. Blacksad arrives to find that Fletcher has died of the strychnine-laden heroin. It also appears that LaChapelle's plans may go in vain as Fletcher was able to perform (though its unknown if any will connect the story to LaChapelle or not). As for Thomas has no interest in his father's money or interest in having children, thus most likely meaning his bloodline will end with him.

Afterwards, Blacksad sees Thomas and Hannah at Fletcher's funeral, and they nod to each other in respect. At the end its revealed in his conversation with Weekly, that Blacksad gave Thomas their payment for the case. To which Blacksad replies "he'll need it". Its unknown if he meant by his apparent genetic disorder or that LaChapelle's deeds will come full surface.

Amarillo

The fifth Blacksad album is set towards the end of the 1950s. Chad (a lion), a writer, travels the road as a vagrant with his on-again-off-again friend Abraham (a bison), a poet, who appears earlier in the Blacksad story, then referred to simply as Greenberg. Abe is extremely volatile towards Chad and his interactions with him lean from harassing to almost sociopathic bullying. Abe views his vocation more romantically than Chad, who sees writing as his career and a means to money, and Abe accuses Chad of not having a true passion like he does. Abe takes his collection of poems he was about to publish and burns them, and encourages the appalled Chad to do the same with his next novel's manuscript, to give it a "proper ending".

Blacksad is happy to be taking a well-earned vacation, staying behind in New Orleans for a while, while Weekly returns home to New York. He lands a side-job when a rich Texan asks him to drive his prized car to Tulsa, Oklahoma where he is flying. Blacksad accepts, enjoying the free road trip. At a pit-stop, two hitch-hikers (who we see are Chad and Abe) steal the prized car and Blacksad, with the help of a street gang, motorcycles after them, hoping to catch them on their way to Amarillo.

Meanwhile, Chad and Abe party with Abe's friend, Billy (a flamingo)—a mobster. In front of all of Billy's friends, Abe humiliates Chad by saying he is afraid of the cops and has no guts, forcing him to prove it by shooting a shotglass off of Abe's head. Chad cannot do it, however, and the entire bar laughs at him. Later on, into the wee hours, Chad, Abe and Billy sit smoking, drinking and talking. Abe drops into the discussion that he has mailed Chad's manuscript off to some place in Tibet, and Chad is instantly infuriated—that novel was his ticket out of the vagrant life, and out of relying on Abe to live. Billy and Abe laugh, until Chad finally takes the gun from earlier and shoots Abe out of vengeance. Horrified, Chad flees in Blacksad's prized car. He crashes it into a post box, and retrieves his manuscript.

Blacksad parts ways with the bike gang in Amarillo and runs into Neal Beato (a hyena), a litigious, suspicious lawyer while he woos a potential client into suing his boss, a circus owner, for replacing him unlawfully. Overhearing their conversation, Blacksad suggests they are after the same person, and they travel to catch up with the circus where Chad is indeed working. Meanwhile, Chad struggles to fit in, and makes friends with one of the performers, a beautiful and mysterious psychic named Luanne (a Siamese cat), but is warned about becoming close to her by one of the clowns, the massive and imposing Polyphemus (a bear). Later that night during a performance, before Luanne is to go out and perform her act, Chad catches Polyphemus attempting to rape Luanne and while Chad and him fight, she stabs him in the neck. It is an uproar as the circus members apprehend the fleeing Chad and after the show finishes, decide the best way to deal with the tragedy is to abandon Chad and Polyphemus' body in the wilderness. Luanne however has tagged along unbeknownst to them and she and Chad escape on the road, to repay Chad for not ratting her out and with mutual thanks they catch a train to start a new life—but Elmore (a koala), the circus leader, finds out they have escaped.

Blacksad and Neal make a stop at Blacksad's sister's (Donna) church, and borrow a car from her and her enthusiastic little son (Ray). Eventually the both of them catch up with the circus. Blacksad questions Elmore about Chad, but Elmore lies and betrays Blacksad to the police. After escaping, Blacksad follows and eavesdrops on Elmore as he tries to kill Chad by throwing him off the moving train, however Elmore misses and plummets to his death. Blacksad sees Chad and Luanne embrace, and realizes what has happened.

At a Greyhound Bus depot in Chicago, Blacksad and Neal arrange for Luanne to stay with Blacksad's sister for a while. Neal promises to represent Chad and get him off with less than a year for the manslaughter of Abe, and help him publish his manuscript—the fabulous payout from Chad's manuscript will make both of them rich. However, out of guilt, Chad has thrown the manuscript away, comparing it to toilet paper. Neal is outraged, and their loud arguing attracts a crowd. Chad tries to stop Neal from walking away, but in grabbing his coat, accidentally imbalances Neal into the road and he is violently hit by one of the buses. Blacksad runs to the ensuing commotion and sees Chad, distraught, holding the bleeding and broken body of Neal in his arms. While the crowd murmurs that Chad pushed him, Neal's last words mention how he fell in love with Blacksad's sister from the moment he saw her. Blacksad and Chad flee. He finds Luanne as she is about to leave and insists Chad go with her, and lie low for a while, while he deals with the police. Blacksad approaches, and is about to be handcuffed... when Chad stops them, and confesses everything, hoping to atone for what he has done.

Blacksad returns to New York, eager to get back to work, and water his plants. Meanwhile, in a bathroom stall back in the Chicago Greyhound Bus depot, a well-to-do man finds an abandoned manuscript in the bathroom, and is engrossed in reading it.

The American version features an introduction by Neal Adams, who co-translated the book into English.

They all Fall Down
As of 2021, two new Blacksad volumes have been released, "They all Fall Down - Part One" and "They all Fall Down - Part Two" , respectively, from a new four-volume story. Part one released on 20 October 2021, and part two on 17 November 2021. The last two parts release dates are still to be revealed.

Future Volumes 
The last 2 parts of the volumes, which will be released in 2023, are still to be announced.

Blacksad: The Collected Stories 
Originally published in France in 2014 as Blacksad L'intégrale, this is a collected edition of the first five Blacksad stories: Somewhere Within the Shadows, Arctic Nation, Red Soul, A Silent Hell and Amarillo. It also collects the comic shorts "Like Cats and Dogs" and "Spit at the Sky", originally published in Pilote Spécial 2003 and Pilote Spécial Noël 2004, respectively.

Commentary
A 'behind the scenes' book has already been compiled, with author commentary, called Blacksad: The Sketch Files.

Film version
In 2006, Variety reported that a film adaptation of Blacksad was in development. To be produced by Thomas Langmann and directed by Louis Leterrier (The Transporter, The Incredible Hulk), it was originally scheduled for a 2009 release. Alexandre Aja (The Hills Have Eyes, Piranha 3D) had also expressed interest in directing the film, which was reportedly budgeted around $100 million. Eventually, Aja is currently working on Mice and Mystics for DreamWorks Animation.

Video game adaptation

Blacksad: Under the Skin is an adventure video game developed by Pendulo Studios and published by Microïds. It was released on 5 November 2019, on PC, PlayStation 4, Xbox One, with a Switch release scheduled for 10 December 2019. The idea of adapting Blacksad into a game was proposed by Microïds to Pendulo, as the publisher is owned by the same media conglomerate as Blacksad publisher Dargaud. The developer opted to create an original story not based on any particular Blacksad installment, but still took influence and inspiration from the existing series. The game was announced in July 2017, and its first teaser trailer was revealed in August 2018. By February 2019, the game had been in production for roughly two years. It was released on 14 November 2019, and a Nintendo Switch port of the game was released on 10 December 2019, to mixed critical reviews, many reviewers praised its atmosphere as being faithful to the comics, but criticized the game's many bugs, crashes, and long loading times.

References

Further reading

External links
 Blacksadmania 
 Blacksad in Guía del cómic 

Dargaud titles
French comics
Fictional cats
Anthropomorphic cats
Fictional police detectives
Fictional private investigators
Detective comics
Harvey Award winners for Best Graphic Album of Original Work
Comics set in the 1950s
Novels set in the United States
Comics about cats
Comics about animals
2000 comics debuts
Comics characters introduced in 2000
Spanish comics
Spanish comics characters
Comics adapted into video games